Stefan Kruger (born 3 August 1966) is a former professional tennis player from South Africa.  He enjoyed most of his tennis success while playing doubles.  During his career he won 3 doubles titles and finished runner-up an additional 5 times.  He achieved a career-high doubles ranking of World No. 39 in 1991.

Career finals

Doubles (3 titles, 5 runner-ups)

References

External links
 
 

South African male tennis players
Living people
Afrikaner people
1966 births
Sportspeople from Cape Town